John Andrew Stedman (1778–1833) was  general in the Dutch army during the Napoleonic Wars.

Biography
Stedman was born at Zutphen in 1778, the son of William George Stedman (a naturalised Dutchman of Scottish descent), and a Dutch mother of noble blood.

Stedman received a commission in the Dutch army when only a child. At the early age of sixteen he first saw service with the allied forces, under Frederick, Duke of York and the Prince of Orange (afterwards King William I of the Netherlands) which were employed in 1794 on the northern frontier of France.

Stedman's next service was in 1799, when the Batavian Republic was in alliance with France, and the Duke of York commanded the opposing army at Bergen. At a later date he again served against the British at Walcheren. Meanwhile he had held important staff appointments, and, on the incorporation of the Netherlands with France, he became general of brigade in the French army. In this capacity he served for two years in Italy, and was in 1813 present at the battles of Bautzen and Dresden.

In 1814 he attached himself to the Prince of Orange (afterwards King William II of the Netherlands), and commanded the Dutch troops in the reserve during the Battle of Waterloo, with the rank of lieutenant-general. He died at Nijmegen in 1833.

Family
Stedman married Nicola Gertrude van de Poll, granddaughter of the last reigning burgomaster of Amsterdam. Their only son, Charles John William Stedman, became a Prussian subject, settling at Besselich Abbey, near Coblentz. He was a member of the national assemblies of Frankfurt am Main and Erfurt, and received the title of freiherr (baron). He had a large family, of which nearly all the sons entered the Queen Augusta Regiment of Guards; they reverted to the original family name of Barton.

Notes

References

Resources
John Stedman (1857), Memoir of the Family of Barton

1778 births
1833 deaths
Dutch generals
Dutch military personnel of the Napoleonic Wars
Dutch people of Scottish descent
People from Zutphen